Madison Township is one of thirteen townships in Washington County, Indiana, United States. As of the 2010 census, its population was 705 and it contained 275 housing units.

Geography

Cities, towns, villages
 Livonia

Adjacent townships
 Vernon Township (north)
 Howard Township (east)
 Posey Township (southeast)
 Southeast Township, Orange County (southwest)
 Stampers Creek Township, Orange County (west)

Cemeteries
The township contains these four cemeteries: Livonia, Hardin, Providence and Sinking Spring.

School districts
 West Washington School Corporation

Political districts
 Indiana's 9th congressional district
 State House District 73
 State Senate District 44

References
 United States Census Bureau 2007 TIGER/Line Shapefiles
 United States Board on Geographic Names (GNIS)
 IndianaMap

External links
 Indiana Township Association
 United Township Association of Indiana

Townships in Washington County, Indiana
Townships in Indiana